A Date With Luyu (also spelled A Date With Lu Yu) is a popular Chinese television talk show that airs on Phoenix Television. Because the show emulates the success and format of The Oprah Winfrey Show, its host and creator, Chen Luyu, has been called "China's Oprah". The show includes a studio audience of about 300. The show covers a wide range of issues: interviewees range from artists and musicians such as Li Yundi, business leaders such as Robin Li, diplomatic figures such as US ambassador to China Gary Locke, academics such as Prof Michael Dobson and sports figures such as Shane Battier.  She is also willing to address controversial subjects.

It is noted that some interviews are conducted in English, with Chinese subtitles, as was the cases when Lu Yu interviewed Wentworth Miller, Nick Vujicic, and Hillary Clinton with Timothy Geithner. Audience members are required to understand English in these instances, because Lu Yu has warned about problems with interviews being done entirely in a single language, i.e. Mandarin Chinese.

Luyu averages 140 million viewers per show.

References

External links 
 Chen Luyu's Autobiography, 陈鲁豫新版心相约
MacDonald, James (March 4, 2007). "Chen Lu Yu: 'China's Oprah'". CNN. Retrieved on March 5, 2007.
Liu, Melinda (October 10, 2005). "The Last Word: Chen Luyu". Newsweek International Edition. Retrieved on March 5, 2007.

Chinese television shows
Chinese television talk shows
1990s Chinese television series
1998 Chinese television series debuts
2000s Chinese television series
2010s Chinese television series
Phoenix Television original programming
Mandarin-language television shows